Diwakar Vaish (born 23 July 1992) is an Indian born robotics researcher and Head of Robotics and Research at A-SET Training and Research Institutes (2010–present). He is the developer of India's first completely indigenous 3D printed humanoid robot (Manav), India's first mind controlled robot, and world's first production brain controlled wheelchair. These technologies and robots were developed at the labs of A-SET Training & Research Institutes. Diwakar is the co-creator alongside All India Institute of Medical Sciences, Delhi the world's cheapest ventilator.

Achievements 
 He is the developer and mind behind Manav (India's first completely indigenous 3D printed humanoid robot)
 He is an alumnus of Sharda University, Noida. He was part of B.Tech (Computer Science program) from 2010-2014 batch 
 In 2017, Diwakar Vaish, alongside All India Institute of Medical Sciences, Delhi co-created the world's cheapest and smallest ventilator, the ventilator does not require an artificial oxygen supply and can process atmospheric air, the ventilator, currently in trials, will cost $250 US Dollars
 He is the developer of Mind controlled Robots (India)
 In 2016, he developed the world's first production brain controlled wheelchair which uses the brain's electrical impulses to command the wheelchair. It has been developed for patients of Locked In Syndrome (LIS).
 He is the developer of an Unmanned Ground Vehicle named "Versatile" which has the capability of changing its shape according to the terrain.

See also 
 Brain Computer Interface

References

External links 
 

Living people
1992 births
Indian roboticists